Ralph Evans (7 February 1924 – 23 July 2000) was an American competitive sailor and Olympic medalist. He won a silver medal in the Firefly class at the 1948 Summer Olympics in London.

References

External links

1924 births
2000 deaths
American male sailors (sport)
Sailors at the 1948 Summer Olympics – Firefly
Olympic silver medalists for the United States in sailing
Medalists at the 1948 Summer Olympics